Musée d'Art Moderne de Paris (in full the Musée d'Art Moderne de la Ville de Paris, the Museum of Modern Art of the City of Paris) or MAM Paris, is a major municipal museum dedicated to modern and contemporary art of the 20th and 21st centuries, including monumental murals by Raoul Dufy, Gaston Suisse, and Henri Matisse. It is located at 11, Avenue du Président Wilson in the 16th arrondissement of Paris.

The museum is one of the 14 City of Paris' Museums that have been incorporated since 1 January 2013 in the public institution Paris Musées.

History
Located in the eastern wing of the Palais de Tokyo and constructed for the International Exhibition of Arts and Technology of 1937, the museum was inaugurated in 1961.

The museum reopened in October 2019 after a €10 million redesign by h2o architectes.

Programs
The museum collections include more than 15,000 works from art movements of the 20th century. Exhibitions highlight the European and international art scenes of the 20th century, as well as  displaying monographic and thematic exhibitions of trends in today's art. Temporary exhibitions run every six weeks.

Collections
The museum's permanent collection includes works by:

Pablo Picasso, Georges Braque, Henri Matisse, Emile Othon Friesz, Wilhelm Lehmbruck, Maurice de Vlaminck, Georges Rouault, Raoul Dufy, Marie Laurencin, Pierre Bonnard, Édouard Vuillard, Albert Marquet, Henri Laurens, Jacques Lipchitz, Jean Metzinger, Albert Gleizes, André Lhote, Juan Gris, Alexander Archipenko, Joseph Csaky, Ossip Zadkine, Marcel Duchamp, Francis Picabia, František Kupka, Robert and Sonia Delaunay, Fernand Léger, Jean Hélion, Auguste Herbin, Joaquín Torres-García, Natalia Gontcharova, Luigi Russolo, Amedeo Modigliani, Giorgio de Chirico, Alberto Magnelli, Gino Severini, Kees van Dongen, Bart van der Leck, Jean Arp, Sophie Taeuber-Arp, Maurice Utrillo, Suzanne Valadon, André Derain, Moïse Kisling, Marcel Gromaire, Marc Chagall, Chaïm Soutine, Leonard Foujita, Alexander Calder, Alberto Giacometti, Jean Crotti, Man Ray, Max Ernst, André Masson, Victor Brauner, Hans Bellmer, Roberto Matta, Wifredo Lam, Jean Fautrier, Jean Dubuffet, Bernard Buffet, Pierre Soulages, Nicolas de Staël, Zao Wou Ki, Pierre Alechinsky, Henri Michaux, Étienne-Martin, Antoni Tàpies, Lucio Fontana, Yves Klein, Arman, Martine Aballéa, Martial Raysse, Jean Tinguely, Christo, Victor Vasarely, François Morellet, Carlos Cruz-Diez, Bridget Riley, Daniel Buren, Nam June Paik, Mario Merz, Giuseppe Penone, Luciano Fabro, Simon Hantaï, Delphine Coindet, Bernard Frize, Jean-Michel Othoniel, Robert Rauschenberg, Keith Haring, John Heartfield, James Lee Byars, Peter Doig, Otto Freundlich, Hannah Höch, Hans Hartung, Gerhard Richter, Georg Baselitz, Sigmar Polke, Jörg Immendorff, Wolf Vostell, Andreas Gursky, Markus Lüpertz, Thomas Schütte, Thomas Ruff, Gisèle Freund, Rosemarie Trockel, Daniel Turner,  Albert Oehlen, Per Kirkeby, Marcel Broodthaers, Zeng Fanzhi, Simon-Auguste,  Gaston Suisse and others.

Gallery

Exhibitions
 Robert Rauschenberg: 1968, Oeuvre de 1949 à 1968
 Andy Warhol: 1970, Rétrospective
 Wolf Vostell: 1974, Environments / Happenings 1958 - 1974, Rétrospective
 John Heartfield: 1974, Photomontages
 Hannah Höch: 1976, Rétrospective
 Nam June Paik: 1978 / 79, Rétrospective
 Joan Mitchell: 1982, Paintings 1970 - 1982, Rétrospective
 Gregor Schneider: 1998
 Jean-Michel Basquiat: 2010/11

2010 theft
On 20 May 2010, Vjeran Tomic broke into the museum and stole several paintings after meticulous preparation. The museum reported the overnight theft of five paintings from its collection the following morning. A window had been smashed and CCTV footage showed a masked man taking the paintings. Authorities believe the thief acted alone. The man carefully removed the paintings from their frames, which he left behind.

The theft was investigated by the Brigade de Répression du Banditisme specialist unit of the French Police. It is unclear why the alarm systems in the museum failed to detect the robbery, staff only noticing when they arrived at the museum just before .

For fear that investigators were closing in on the thief, accomplices apparently destroyed the paintings. "I threw them into the trash," cried Yonathan Birn, one of three people on trial in the case, "I made the worst mistake of my existence." However, neither the judge nor other defendants believed Birn's statement. The authorities believe all of the paintings were removed from France. Birn's co-defendants testified he was "too smart" to destroy €100 million worth of artwork.

The theft follows the $162 million heist of masterpieces by Cézanne, Degas, Van Gogh and Monet from Foundation E.G. Bührle in Zurich in February 2008 and could be one of the biggest art thefts in history (by value).  It has been described as the "heist of the century".

References

External links 

 
 City of Paris portal 

 Paris Musées official website

Art Moderne de la Ville de Paris
Art Moderne de la Ville de Paris
Buildings and structures in the 16th arrondissement of Paris
Art Moderne de la Ville de Paris
1961 establishments in France
Paris Musées